High Ice, also known as Challenge of the High Ice, is a 1980 American adventure television film directed by Eugene S. Jones and starring David Janssen, Tony Musante, Madge Sinclair, and Gretchen Corbett. Its plot follows a park ranger and army lieutenant attempting to save three rock climbers stranded on a mountain ledge. The film was released in the United States as an NBC Movie of the Week in early 1980, but was given a theatrical release internationally. The extended theatrical cut of the film shown in foreign countries includes nude sequences that were excised from the television version.

Premise
A park ranger (David Janssen) clashes with an army lieutenant (Tony Musante) regarding the rescue efforts of three rock climbers stranded on a mountain ledge in Washington.

Cast

Production
Filming took place in Darrington, Washington in the summer of 1979. The production budget was approximately $2 million.

Release
Upon its airing on NBC in January 1980, High Ice was met by approximately 25 million viewers in the United States. The film was subsequently given a theatrical release internationally, with nudity which had been cut from the television version reinstated. The film aired on television again in the late 1980s on MTV.

Critical response
James Brown of the Los Angeles Times deemed the film a "visually breathtaking, but dramatically stuttering diversion...  Director Eugene Jones further hampers his own cause with some choppy transitions, confusing flashbacks and muddled dramatic focus."

References

External links

1980 films
1980s disaster films
American disaster films
American television films
American adventure films
Films shot in Washington (state)
Mountaineering films
1980s American films